Maura McNicholas is a former camogie player, winner of the AIB Gaelic Star award for Camogie Junior Player of the year in 1986.

Family
Her mother Kitty played at centre field when Clare won the All Ireland junior championship in 1974.

Career
She won Clare under-12 titles with Éire Óg Ennis and Munster colleges titles with Colaiste Mhuire, Ennis, winning two Munster minor medals, a Munster junior medal and two junior Gael Linn Cups. She averaged ten points a match when Clare won the 1986 All Ireland junior championship. She won an All Ireland Vocational Schools medal.

References

External links
 Camogie.ie Official Camogie Association Website
 Wikipedia List of Camogie players

Living people
Clare camogie players
Year of birth missing (living people)